DX Cancri is a variable star in the northern zodiac constellation of Cancer. With an apparent visual magnitude of 14.81, it is much too faint to be seen with the naked eye. This makes it the 18th closest star (or star system) to the Sun.

The star has a stellar classification of M6.5V, identifying it as a type of main sequence star known as a red dwarf. It has about 9% of the mass of the Sun, and 11% of the Sun's radius. The outer envelope of the star has an effective temperature of 2,840 K, making it an M-type star. It is a flare star that has random, intermittent increases in brightness by up to a factor of five. It is a proposed member of the Castor Moving Group of stars that share a common trajectory through space. This group has an estimated age of 200 million years.


See also
List of nearest stars

References

Further reading
 Table with parallaxes.

External links
SolStation entry
ARICNS
http://www.richweb.f9.co.uk/astro/nearby_stars.htm

M-type main-sequence stars
Flare stars
Local Bubble
Cancer (constellation)
1111
Cancri, DX